Red Rock is a township in Northwestern Ontario, Canada, located in the Thunder Bay District. The community of Red Rock sits on the shore of Lake Superior, about 16 km west of the Nipigon River where it drains into Nipigon Bay on the north shore of Lake Superior. The population as of 2011 is 942.

History
During the Second World War, a prisoner of war camp was established here housing primarily German prisoners.

The Red Rock Folk Festival, held by the Live From the Rock Folk & Blues Society, is held each year.

Demographics 

Economy

Red Rock's main source of employment was a kraft paper mill owned by Norampac.  The mill originally consisted of two kraft paper machines but in late 2005 was reduced to running one machine. On August 31, 2006, Norampac announced the indefinite closure of the container board plant.  This was due to unfavourable economic conditions such as the rising price of fibre, energy costs and the strengthening Canadian dollar.

In September 2007 Norampac announced the sale of its Red Rock plant to American Logistic Services Inc. A new plywood mill was supposed to be operational by fall 2008, this deadline had been pushed back to spring 2009. The plans were ultimately cancelled however as the plant was torn down and the land was sold to Riversedge Developments in April 2015. There has been talk of constructing a sea port and biomass plant on the land, but it remains unclear whether this will be the case.

Notable residents

 Heather Houston, 1989 Women's World Curling Champion

See also
List of townships in Ontario

References

External links 

Hudson's Bay Company trading posts
Municipalities in Thunder Bay District
Single-tier municipalities in Ontario
Township municipalities in Ontario
Populated places on Lake Superior in Canada